Gimira may refer to:

 Gimira people, an Omotic-speaking people in southwestern Ethiopia
 Gimira language, Omotic language spoken by the Gimira people